Pultenaea penna, commonly known as feather bush-pea, is a species of flowering plant in the family Fabaceae and is endemic to south-eastern continental Australia. It is a rigid, spreading shrub with linear, needle-shaped leaves and yellow and red, pea-like flowers.

Description
Pultenaea penna is a rigid, spreading shrub with glabrous stems. The flowers are arranged in leaf axils in tight cluster of four or five near the ends of branchlets. Flowering mainly occurs from November to December and the fruit is an egg-shaped pod.

Taxonomy and naming
The specific epithet (penna) is a Latin word for "feather", "wing" or "pen".

Distribution and habitat
Feather bush-pea grows in heathy woodland in the Little Desert National Park in Victoria and in the south-east of South Australia.

Conservation status
This species of peas is listed as "vulnerable" in Victoria, under the Victorian Government Flora and Fauna Guarantee Act 1988.

References

penna
Flora of South Australia
Plants described in 2003
Flora of Victoria (Australia)